Flashpoint is an Australian current affairs television program. It airs on the Seven Network in Perth, and is presented by Tim McMillan, with Peter Rowsthorn and Ben Harvey appearing as recurring co-presenters.

References

External links

2019 Australian television series debuts
English-language television shows
Television shows set in Australia